I Don't Know Why I Act This Way is the fourth solo album of the singer-songwriter Jude Cole. Released in 1995, eight years after his self-titled debut solo album.

A follow up effort to Start the Car, and A View from 3rd Street, I Don't Know Why I Act This Way brings the listener to something new with Jude Cole. This album is about a wide variety of human emotions and conditions. It is one of Jude's most "intense" lyrical efforts. It is complete with complex arrangements and production and the many unexpected instrumental twists that have become his trademark.

The album cover depicts Cole in the right foreground, while the background is a direct recreation of Edward Hopper's works.  Specifically, the left side bears a very strong resemblance to Nighthawks, while the right is a direct copy of 7 AM.

Track listing 
All songs written by Jude Cole except as indicated.

 "Speed of Life" (4:47) (Cole, George M. Green)
 "Believe in You" (4:01)
 "Move If You're Goin'" (3:35)
 "Lowlife" (4:56)
 "Joe" (4:36) (Cole, Green)
 "Sheila Don't Remember" (3:12) (Cole, Green)
 "Take the Reins" (4:27)
 "Madison" (3:54)
 "Hole at the Top of the World" (3:45) (Cole, Green)
 "Heaven's Last Attempt" (4:21)

Credits 
Cover art by Tony Wright

References

1995 albums
Jude Cole albums
Albums produced by Ron Aniello
Island Records albums